Thabani Ndlovu, known professionally as Buffalo Souljah, is a South Africa-based Zimbabwean reggae recording artist and songwriter. He won ten times at the Channel O Africa Music Video Awards, Soundcity Music Awards, and Zimdancehall Awards. He owns the record label U.N.A. (United Nations of Africa Music Group).

Early life 

Ndlovu was born in 1980 in Bulawayo as the third-born in a family of four. He then moved to Harare, where he was raised in the high-density suburb of Mufakose. He attended Mufakose High School and then moved to South Africa soon after graduating.

Career 

Buffalo Souljah's career began at the age of eight when he composed his first song, "Zuva Randisinga Kanganwe" (The day I will never forget). The song was inspired by a childhood incident in which he and his brother were chased by some baboons after having taunted and provoked them. Buffalo credits his passion for music to his father, who was also a musician. His father was a jazz artist and saxophonist who worked with Thomas Mapfumo in the late 1970s and early 1980s.

Buffalo Souljah also recorded an Afro-jazz album called Indolvu Yangena on VaNyoni Beats Records, working closely with Mzilikazi Wa Afrika.

Early collaborations 

In 1996, Buffalo Souljah and his friends David Zulu and Stewart Chamirai formed the group Intelligent Racuss Cruuks, formerly known as ULD, aka Prettybway. The group released three afro hip-hop albums, a mix of traditional music called jiti and hip-hop which involved a hip-hop drum, kick, and bass sequence fused with the Zimbabwean traditional instrument Mbira.

When he moved to South Africa in 1999, he entered its music industry and worked with several South African artists, featuring on their albums. In 2002, he had his first break working with the Ghanaian artist Kweku, aka Instinct. He was later involved with a group called Street Disciples and published an album, The Chosen Ones under the label Da Apostles.

Record deal: United Nations of Africa (U.N.A) 
Later, Buffalo Souljah signed with HOTWAX records, a record album owned by veteran DJ Waxxy. Buffalo Souljah now owns and heads a record label called U.N.A. (United Nations of Africa), and signed his first artist, Vanessa Sibanda, formerly known as Queen Vee, in 2010. Queen Vee is a former pageant queen, being crowned Miss Zimbabwe in 2008. After relinquishing the crown in 2009, Queen Vee relocated to South Africa and met Big Buff, who eventually signed her to his label United Nations of Africa. Since 2010, Queen Vee has worked with celebrated musicians such as A L-Tido, Ziyon from Liquid Deep and AB Crazy among others.

Endorsements 
Buffalo Souljah has signed endorsements with One Campaign, Coke Studios, and One Man Band.

Performances 

Harare International Festival of the Arts Zimbabwe
Lake of Stars
Nigeria Calaba Festival
Tanzania Hip-Hop Mag Festival
City of Joburg New Year's Eve
Washington DC African Summit Concert
Lake of Malawi
Malaysia African Diaspora Festival

Notable singles 

In 2008, Buffalo Souljah released a dancehall single, "Bubble Ya Bums", for his debut album. It became a hit. The music video was on high rotation on Channel O and MTV Base and won him two Channel O Spirit Of Africa Awards in the categories "Best Newcomer" and "Best Dancehall/Ragga" respectively.

Discography

Awards and recognition 
In 2013, Buffalo Souljah was appointed the Zimbabwean Youth Cultural Ambassador by Minister S. Kasukuwere.

Buffalo Souljah is the only Zimbabwean artist to win multiple Channel O Music Video Awards (six in total).

References 

Living people
1980 births
Zimbabwean musicians
South African musicians
People from Bulawayo
People from Harare
Zimbabwean emigrants to South Africa